Heaney is a surname of Irish origin.  It is an Anglicisation of the Gaelic Ó hEignigh, thought to be based on the  Gaelic  a personal name meaning "horseman". It was mistakenly thought to derive from Éan, Gaelic for Bird.
Versions of it are written in the Annals from the 8th century  and has a diverse array of modern derivations and origins.
  
They were chiefs of Fermanagh and Kings of Airgíalla before the expansion south of Uí Néill branches Cenél Fearadhaigh and Cenél nEoghain into Airgíalla and the rise of The Maguires in Fermanagh. They became allies to repel the Normans in the 13th century.

1127, Gillachrist Ua hEighnigh, king of Feara-Manach, and chief king of Oirghiall, died in Clochar-Uí-nDaimhin (then the Royal capital of Airgíalla), after choice penance.

Notable people with the surname include:
 Aaron Heaney, Seapatrick fc
 Aidan Heaney, retired English football player
 Andrew Heaney, baseball player
 Bob Heaney, Canadian former ice hockey player
 Charles Heaney, American photographer and painter
 Craig Heaney, British actor of screen, stage and radio
 Dermot Heaney, former Irish Gaelic footballer 
 Francis Heaney, crossword compiler
 Frank Heaney, (1886–1937), Irish footballer
 Gerald William Heaney, (1918–2010), federal judge on the United States Court of Appeals
 Gerald Heaney (magician), (1899–1974), American magician
 Geraldine Heaney, Irish-Canadian ice hockey head coach
 Harry Heaney, Emeritus Professor of Organic Chemistry 
 Joe Heaney (AKA Joe Éinniú), (1919-1984), was an Irish traditional (sean nós) singer from County Galway, Ireland.
 Katie Heaney, American writer
 Mark Heaney, drummer
 Neil Heaney, English former footballer 
Patrick Heeney, (1881–1911), sometimes spelt Heaney, was an Irish composer whose most famous work is the music to the Irish national anthem "Amhrán na bhFiann" (English: "The Soldier's Song").
 Sarah Heaney, Scottish television presenter
 Seamus Heaney, (1939–2013) was an Irish poet, playwright and translator. He received the 1995 Nobel Prize in Literature.
 Stewart Heaney, Canadian cricketer
 Thomas Heaney, Australian rules footballer
 Tim Heaney, (1914–1996), South African cricketer

References

English-language surnames
Anglicised Irish-language surnames
Surnames of Irish origin